Terelabrus rubrovittatus, also known as the white-striped hogfish is a species of wrasse native to the central western Pacific Ocean.

References

Labridae
Taxa named by Pierre Fourmanoir
Taxa named by John Ernest Randall
Fish described in 1998
Fish of the Pacific Ocean